Taiof Island, also known as Toiokh Island, is a small island off the north-western coast of Bougainville Island, in the Autonomous Region of Bougainville in eastern Papua New Guinea.

It is located in the north-eastern Solomon Islands Archipelago.

Islands of Papua New Guinea
Geography of the Autonomous Region of Bougainville
Solomon Islands (archipelago)